There are many colleges and universities providing professional education in many fields in Telangana.

State Universities 

State universities are run and funded by the State government of each of the States of India.

Following the adoption of the Constitution of India in 1950, education became a state responsibility. Following a constitutional change in 1976, it became a joint responsibility of the states and the central government. University Grants Commission (India) (UGC) list of receiving Central / UGC assistance in Telangana.
 Osmania University.
 Jawaharlal Nehru Technological University, Hyderabad.
 Kakatiya University.
 Kaloji Narayana Rao University of Health Sciences
 NALSAR University of Law, Hyderabad.
 Potti Sreeramulu Telugu University, Hyderabad.
 Satavahana University, Karimnagar.
 Mahatma Gandhi University, Nalgonda.
 Palamuru University, Mahabubnagar.
 Telangana University, Nizamabad.

Central Universities 

A Central University or a Union University in India is established by Act of Parliament and are under the purview of the Department of Higher Education in the Union Human Resource Development Ministry. In general, universities in India are recognised by the University Grants Commission, which draws its power from the University Grants Commission Act, 1956. In addition, 15 Professional Councils are established, controlling different aspects of accreditation and co-ordination. Central universities, in addition, are covered by the Central Universities Act, 2009, which regulates their purpose, powers, governance etc., and established universities. The following universities are located in the premises of historical city Hyderabad.

 University of Hyderabad
 English and Foreign Languages University, Hyderabad
 Maulana Azad National Urdu University, Hyderabad

Major educational and research institutes 

Centre for Economic and Social Studies, Nizamiah Observatory Campus, Begumpet, Hyderabad
International Crops Research Institute for the Semi-Arid Tropics (ICRISAT)-Hyderabad
 Indian Institute of Technology Hyderabad,
Birla Institute of Technology and Science, Pilani – Hyderabad 
 National Institute of Technology, Warangal (Warangal),
 International Institute of Information Technology, Hyderabad,
 National Institute of Fashion Technology, Hyderabad
 Tata Institute of Fundamental Research Hyderabad
 Tata Institute of Social Sciences, Hyderabad
 National Institute of Nutrition NIN, Tarnaka, Hyderabad
 Electronics Corporation of India Limited (ECIL), Hyderabad
 Centre for Cellular and Molecular Biology (CCMB), Hyderabad
 Indian Institute of Chemical Technology (IICT), Hyderabad
 Centre for DNA Fingerprinting and Diagnostics (CDFD), Hyderabad
 National Geophysical Research Institute (NGRI), Hyderabad
 Defence Research Development Organization (DRDO), Hyderabad
 Defence Metallurgical Research Laboratory (DMRL), Hyderabad
 Nuclear Fuel Complex (NFC)
 National Academy of Agricultural Research Management (NAARM),  ICAR, Hyderabad
 Directorate of Rice Research (DRR), ICAR, Hyderabad
 National Institute of Rural Development,
 National Institute of Pharmaceutical Education and Research, Hyderabad
Indian Institute of Packaging, Hyderabad

Medical colleges and research institutes 
 Osmania Medical College, Koti, Hyderabad
 Gandhi Medical College, Musheerabad, Secunderabad
 Nizam's Institute of Medical Sciences (NIMS), Hyderabad
 Kakatiya Medical College, Warangal
 Government Medical College, Nizamabad
 Rajiv Gandhi Institute of Medical Sciences, Adilabad
 Mamata Medical College, Giriprasad Nagar, Khammam 507002
 Deccan College of Medical Sciences, Hyderabad
 Shadan Institute of Medical Sciences, Hyderabad
 Bhaskar Medical College & General Hospital, Hyderabad

References

Universities and colleges in Telangana
Education
Telangana